Axel Wilhelm Runström (October 15, 1883 – August 10, 1943) was a Swedish water polo player and diver who competed in the 1908 Summer Olympics and in the 1912 Summer Olympics.

In 1908 he was part of the Swedish water polo team, which was able to win the bronze medal. But In the diving platform event he was eliminated in the first round. In 1912 he was eliminated in the first round of the 3 metre springboard event, but was able to finish sixth in the plain high diving competition.

See also
 Dual sport and multi-sport Olympians
 List of Olympic medalists in water polo (men)

References

External links
 

1883 births
1943 deaths
Swedish male water polo players
Swedish male divers
Olympic water polo players of Sweden
Olympic divers of Sweden
Water polo players at the 1908 Summer Olympics
Divers at the 1908 Summer Olympics
Divers at the 1912 Summer Olympics
Olympic bronze medalists for Sweden
Olympic medalists in water polo
Medalists at the 1908 Summer Olympics